Raúl Martín may refer to:
 Raúl Martín (footballer) (born 1979), footballer from Spain
 Raúl Martín (bishop) (born 1957), bishop of Santa Rosa, Argentina
 Raúl Martín (artist), Spanish paleoartist
 Raúl Martín (swimmer) (born 1941), Cuban Olympic swimmer